Rr. Alberthiene Endah Kusumawardhani Hilaul-Sutoyo (16 September), better known as Alberthiene Endah, is an Indonesian biographer, novelist, and journalist. She is known for her in-depth biographies of Indonesian celebrities, such as Chrisye and Krisdayanti. She has been called "the most sought after biographer in [Indonesia]."

Biography
Endah was born in Bandung, West Java, but grew up in Depok. She was interested in writing from a young age, and decided to become a journalist while in junior high school. Upon graduating senior high school she majored in Dutch literature at Universitas Indonesia.

Endah received her first job working for the magazine Hidup in 1993. In 1996, she started at the women's magazine Femina. While working at Femina, Endah interviewed many people, among them Jennifer Lopez, Xanana Gusmão, and Krisdayanti, who asked her to write her biography. That biography was released in 2003 under the title Seribu Satu KD.

In 2004, Endah resigned from her position at Femina to focus on her career as a freelance writer and lead the editorial board at Prodo magazine. During this time, she was approached by several public figures and asked to write their biography.

She also released her first novel, Don't Give Me Drugs, in 2004. Don't Give Me Drugs received an award from the Indonesian National Narcotics Agency for her "effort in combating drugs" and first place at the 2005 Adikarya Awards. In 2005, Don't Give Me Drugs was adapted into the film The Last Second.

Between May and November 2006, Endah worked on writing musician Chrisye's biography while he was battling lung cancer. She has called it her "most special" work and Chrisye's willingness to be interviewed "like a miracle."

In 2010 she announced that she was working on a biography of actress Luna Maya. Endah has stated that she plans on writing a full biography, not just about the star's recent sex tape scandal.

Personal life
Endah is married to Indonesian photographer Dio Hilaul.

When writing biographies, Endah participates in the subjects day-to-day activities. She has called writing biographies "like dating [the subject]", because of the need to be involved in their activities. She has accompanied subjects on tour, in video editing sessions, and during their fight against cancer.

Bibliography
Her works include:

Notes

References

Living people
Indonesian Christians
Indonesian writers
People from Bandung
Indonesian journalists
Indonesian women novelists
Indonesian novelists
Year of birth missing (living people)
Celebrity biographers
Women biographers
Indonesian women journalists